4149 Harrison, provisional designation , is a stony Eunomian asteroid from the middle region of the asteroid belt, approximately 10 kilometers in diameter. The asteroid was discovered on 9 March 1984, by American astronomer Brian Skiff at Lowell's Anderson Mesa Station in Flagstaff, Arizona, and named after musician George Harrison.

Orbit and classification 

Harrison is a member of the Eunomia family, a large group of S-type asteroids and the most prominent family in the intermediate main-belt. It orbits the Sun in the central main-belt at a distance of 2.3–3.0 AU once every 4 years and 4 months (1,590 days). Its orbit has an eccentricity of 0.12 and an inclination of 13° with respect to the ecliptic. A first precovery was taken at Palomar Observatory in 1977, extending the body's observation arc by 7 years prior to its discovery.

Physical characteristics

Rotation period 

A rotational lightcurve of Harrison was obtained from photometric observations by Czech astronomer Petr Pravec at Ondřejov Observatory in May 2015. It gave a well-defined rotation period of  hours with a brightness variation of 0.42 in magnitude. During the following month, photometric observations at three Italian observatories gave a second lightcurve with a period of  hours and an amplitude of 0.37 in magnitude.

Diameter and albedo 

According to the survey carried out by the NEOWISE mission of NASA's Wide-field Infrared Survey Explorer, Harrison measures 10.1 and 10.7 kilometers in diameter and its surface has an albedo of 0.19 and 0.23, respectively, while the Collaborative Asteroid Lightcurve Link assumes an albedo of 0.21 – derived from 15 Eunomia, the family's largest member and namesake – and calculates a diameter of 8.1 kilometers with an absolute magnitude of 12.76.

Naming 

This minor planet was named in honor of guitarist, singer and songwriter, George Harrison (1943–2001), who was the lead guitarist of the English rock band The Beatles, after which the main-belt asteroid 8749 Beatles is named. The minor planets 4147 Lennon, 4148 McCartney and 4150 Starr honor the other three members of the band. The official naming citation was published by the Minor Planet Center on 10 April 1990.

Notes

References

External links 
 Asteroid Lightcurve Database (LCDB), query form (info )
 Dictionary of Minor Planet Names, Google books
 Asteroids and comets rotation curves, CdR – Observatoire de Genève, Raoul Behrend
 Discovery Circumstances: Numbered Minor Planets (1)-(5000) – Minor Planet Center
 
  
 

004149
Discoveries by Brian A. Skiff
Named minor planets
George Harrison
19840309